Prince Chibudom Nwuche  was born in Enugu into the royal family of Clifford Cheta Nwuche and Grace Ogbuta Nwuche. He is from Ochigba town in Ahoada East in the Local Government Area of Rivers State.

Nwuche began his educational career at St Cyprians State School in Port Harcourt where he obtained his First School Leaving Certificate. His secondary school education was at the Stella Maris College in Port Harcourt, Rivers State where he graduated with an Ordinary Level School Certificate in 1979. He then proceeded to his advanced Levels at Lansdowne College, Oxford, United Kingdom.	

He was educated at the University of Keele between 1982 and 1985 where he graduated with a Bachelor of Arts (Hons) in politics and philosophy, with subsidiary subjects in history and astronomy. Between 1985 and 1987, Nwuche obtained an LLB (Hons) in Law, with a Second Class Upper Division at Aberystwyth University after which he returned to Nigeria for the mandatory Bar Programme at the Nigerian Law School. He then obtained a master's degree in law (LLM) at King's College London specializing in shipping law, international finance, intellectual property and international commercial law.

Nwuche also attended several courses, seminars, and workshops within and outside the country on public policy, legislative matters, etc.

During his school days, he exhibited leadership qualities; having been appointed prefect in Secondary School. He was also elected President of the Nigerian Society while at the University of Keele, Staffordshire.

Work experience/positions

As a young man determined to make a mark, Nwuche, after his studies returned to Nigeria, has since then worked in various organisations and held posts in which he performed creditably. Some of these include:

 Legal Practitioner in the law firms of Mudiaga Odje and company, Ajumogobia Okeke and Oyebode (1990–1992)
 Legal Adviser and Consultant to Petgas Resources International Limited (1992–1994). A crude oil trading Company working in co-operation with many international oil companies including Inter Petrol SA of Argentina, Nap-Oil, and Mark-Rich International. Zug, Switzerland.
 Beneficial Term Contract Agreements were entered between these companies and the Nigerian National Petroleum Corporation.
 He was the managing director of Rheingold Nigeria Limited. (1994–1998). An oil company specialized in the provision of Engineering services to oil producing companies ranging from procurement and civil and mechanical works to seismic Acquisition. He was also a director of Omega Petroleum and Energy Company Limited which specialized in the shipping of wet cargoes and marketing coastal petroleum products.

In recognition of his impressive achievements in academia, legal practice, business and humanitarian services, the people of Ahoada East/Abua Odual Federal Constituency of Rivers State voted him in as their representative at the National Assembly in 1999. His colleagues also elected him as Deputy Speaker of the House of Representatives on 4 June 1999. As Deputy Speaker of the House of Representatives, he chaired the following committees:

 Chairman, Committee of Whole
 Vice-Chairman, House of Representatives' Committee of Selection.
 Vice-Chairman, National Assembly Joint Committee on the review of the 1999 Constitution.

He has led several delegations to various International Summits and Conferences. These include:

 The Nigerian Parliamentary Delegation to the Economic Community of West African States (ECOWAS)
 Commonwealth Parliamentary Association (CPA) African Region, Ghana (August 1999)
 Parliamentary visit to India (October 2000)
 Parliamentary visit to People's Republic of China (July 2000 and July 2002 respectively)
 The 106th Conference of Interparliamentary Union (IPU) Ouagadougou, Burkina Faso (September 2001)
 The 107th Conference of Interparliamentary Union (IPU) Morocco (March 2002)
 Commonwealth Conference of Speakers and Presiding Officers, Kesane, Botswana (January 2002).
 Parliamentary Delegation to Venezuela (October 2002)
 Global Conference of Parliamentarians Against Corruption (GOPAC) Ottawa, Ontario, Canada (October 2002).

Prince Nwuche is the sponsor of the following Bills:

 Nigerians With Disability Bill: This seeks to set up a National Commission for Disabled Persons.
 Women Trafficking and Child Labour Eradication Foundation (WOTCLEF): Bill establishing a National Agency to enforce laws against trafficking of persons, particularly women and children. This bill was proposed by the founder of WOTCLEF, Chief Mrs. Amina Titi Atiku-Abubakar, wife of Atiku Abubakar, a former Vice-President of Nigeria.
 The Nigeria Media Bill: which is an Amalgamation of all laws relating to the media in Nigeria.
 The Nigerian Local Content Bill: To allow for greater participation of indigenous companies in the oil industry

He is also noted for his commitment to the promotion of dialogue between the Organized Private Sector (OPS) and the National Assembly, especially with regards to local industrial capacity building within the context of the World Trade Organization (WTO). He is also a facilitator of dialogue between a coalition of Non-Governmental Organizations and the Parliament on issues of media rights, and sustenance of a credible democratic system.

A community worker and grassroots activist, Prince Nwuche has played an important role in the passage of the Niger Delta Development Commission Act and the Onshore Offshore Dichotomy Bill. He has set up scholarships and grant schemes for indigent students and small/medium scale business men and women respectively.

Membership of organisations and boards
Prince Nwuche is presently a member of several professional bodies. These include:

 Member, Institute of Directors, Nigeria
 Member, Nigerian Association of Chambers of Commerce, Industry, Mines and Agriculture, NACCIMA
 Member, Institute of Petroleum, London
 Member, Nigerian Institute of Management (NIM)
 Chairman, Trade Group of Nigeria – South Africa Chamber of Commerce (1995)
 Member, Nigerian Bar Association (NBA)
 Member, International Bar Association (IBA)
 Member, board of directors of Global Organization of Parliamentarians Against Corruption (GOPAC).
 Chairman, Nigerian Chapter, African Parliamentarians Network Against Corruption.
 Member and leader of the Nigerian contingent to the Ecowas Parliament
 Member board of directors of Nigerian Association of Investment Promotion Agencies (NAIPA)

Traditional titles
Adigwe Ekpeye of Ekpeye land
Ada – Idaha ke Efik Eburutu of Calabar
Aha Eji Aga Mba of Okigwe
Onwa Netiliora of Enugu State
Agbawo Dike Izu of Egbema
Ozulumba of Umunya
Nta-Nta of Oron
Ebubedike of Ogbunike
Mataimakin Sarkin Talakawan Nijeriya

Honours and awards
Member of the Order of the Federal Republic (OFR)
African International Worthy Ambassador (AIWA) – All African Students Union.
Life Patron, National Union of Rivers States Students (NURSS).
Hallmark Award for Distinguished Nigerians of the 21st Century.
Award of exceptional performance in politics – Igbo National Council (INC) 2001
Award of Excellence in Politics and Leadership Accomplishment
Certificate of Membership 003309 – Nigerian Institute of Management (NIM)
Award of Honorary Fellow of the Association – Nigeria Association of Technologists in Engineering (NATE)

Publications
Prince Nwuche has authored some academic works. These include:
Larceny in English and Australian Law
Restructuring the Oil Industry to allow for full participation by producing states and communities.
Africa: The Process of Integration and Impact of Globalization – (Presented as Guest Lecturer at Emancipation Day Celebrations in Trinidad and Tobago, 1 August 2003, under the auspices of Caribbean Historical Society)

Foundation
Founder: Foundation for Youth Development

References

External links
 www.chibudomnwuche.com

Living people
Alumni of Aberystwyth University
Alumni of Keele University
Alumni of King's College London
Members of the House of Representatives (Nigeria) from Rivers State
Members of the Order of the Federal Republic
Nigerian royalty
People from Enugu
Rivers State politicians
Rivers State lawyers
Year of birth missing (living people)